Attard is a Maltese surname which has origins in the neighboring island of Sicily. The name might mean Atha which means "noble" and Hardu which means "strong". Another possibility is that it comes from the village of Atti, Italy. Notable people with the surname include:
Cain Attard (born 1994), Maltese footballer
Charlene Attard (born 1987), Maltese track and field sprint athlete
Giovanni Attard ( 1570–1636), Maltese architect and military engineer
Jayden Attard (born 1986), Australian rules footballer
Karen Attard (born 1958), Australian writer of fantasy and short fiction
Larry Attard (born 1951), Canadian Hall of Fame Champion jockey and horse trainer
 Laura Attard (born 1986), Australian rules footballer  
Monica Attard (born 1958), Australian journalist
Norbert Francis Attard (born 1951), Maltese multi-disciplinary artist
Sid C. Attard (born 1950), Canadian  horse racing trainer
Joseph Attard (born 1965), former football referee
Wilfred Attard (died 2001), Maltese chess master
Stephen Attard (born 1992), American Bakery Manager at Cantoro Italian Market and Trattoria 

Maltese-language surnames